Vangjel Koça (1900–1943) journalist, an Albanian ideologue of fascism, translator, publisher in the interwar period, better known with his nom de plume Vangjo Nirvana. Along with Ismet Toto, Branko Merxhani, Nebil Çika etc., he was one of the main representatives of the Neo-Albanianism (neo-shqiptarizma) school of thought in the 1930s.

He was born in Gjirokastër. He was a translator of Epictetus, Lucian and Descartes, and wrote articles under the playful pen name Vangjo Nirvana. Vangjel Koça became a leader of the Fascist Party after Albania’s invasion in 1939. 
He drowned in the Adriatic Sea, while trying to escape to Italy, on August 1943.

References 

Albanian fascists
Albanian collaborators with Fascist Italy
1900 births
1943 deaths
People from Gjirokastër